Geiss may refer to:
18032 Geiss, an asteroid
Cristof Geiss, German mathematician
Imanuel Geiss (1931-2012), German historian
Johannes Geiss (1926-2020), a leading Swiss space scientist
Geiss, Menznau, a village in the Menznau municipality, Switzerland